Bright Lights Film Journal is an online popular-academic film magazine, based in Oakland, California, United States. It is edited and published by Gary Morris.

Originally a print publication established in 1974, it was discontinued in 1980 to be restarted and re-discontinued in 1993, and 1995 respectively. The magazine moved to online publishing exclusively in 1996 and has continued publication ever since. It is indexed in academic research databases such as MLA (Modern Language Association) ProQuest and the Film & Television Literature Index.

In 2009, select interviews from the journal were compiled in a print anthology, Action!: Interviews with Directors from Classical Hollywood to Contemporary Iran, published by Anthem Press as part of its "New Perspectives on World Cinema" series.

See also
 Senses of Cinema
 The Moving Arts Film Journal
 List of film periodicals

References

Online magazines published in the United States
Film review websites
Film magazines published in the United States
Quarterly magazines published in the United States
American film websites
Magazines established in 1974
Magazines published in California
Magazines disestablished in 1995
Online magazines with defunct print editions